The Zee Cine Award for Best Actor – Female is chosen by the members of Zee Entertainment Enterprises as part of its annual award ceremony for Hindi films, to recognise a female actor who has delivered an outstanding performance in a leading role. Following its inception in 1998, a ceremony wasn't held in 2009 and 2010, but resumed back in 2011.

Superlatives

Multiple Winners
4 Wins : Alia Bhatt
2 Wins : Tabu, Aishwarya Rai, Rani Mukerji, Kajol, Deepika Padukone, & Vidya Balan

Multiple Nominees
9 Nominations : Kajol, Deepika Padukone
 8 Nominations : Aishwarya Rai, Kareena Kapoor
 7 Nominations : Rani Mukerji
 6 Nominations : Karisma Kapoor
 5 Nominations : Vidya Balan, Anushka Sharma, Alia Bhatt
 4 Nominations : Priyanka Chopra, Preity Zinta, Tabu
 3 Nominations : Katrina Kaif, Madhuri Dixit, Urmila Matondkar, Kriti Sanon

Winners and nominees

1990s

2000s

2010s

2020s

Notes

References

See also
 Zee Cine Awards
 Bollywood
 Cinema of India

Film awards for lead actress
Zee Cine Awards